Pseudomonas mandelii is a fluorescent, Gram-negative, rod-shaped bacterium isolated from natural spring waters in France.<ref>{{cite journal |author=Verhille |title=Taxonomic study of bacteria isolated from natural mineral waters: proposal of Pseudomonas jessenii sp. nov. and Pseudomonas mandelii sp. nov. |journal=Syst Appl Microbiol |volume=22 |issue=1 |pages=45–58 |date=Feb 1999 |pmid=10188278 |last2=Baida |first2=N |last3=Dabboussi |first3=F |last4=Izard |first4=D |last5=Leclerc |first5=H |doi=10.1016/S0723-2020(99)80027-7|display-authors=etal}}</ref> Based on 16S rRNA analysis, P. mandelii has been placed in the P. fluorescens'' group.

References

External links
Type strain of Pseudomonas mandelii at BacDive -  the Bacterial Diversity Metadatabase

Pseudomonadales
Bacteria described in 1999